The Botswana men's national under-18 basketball team is a national basketball team of Botswana, administered by the Botswana Basketball Association (BBA).

It represents the country in international under-18 (under age 18) basketball competitions.

It appeared at the 2016 FIBA Africa Under-18 Championship qualifying round.

See also
Botswana men's national basketball team
Botswana men's national under-16 basketball team
Botswana women's national under-18 basketball team

References

External links
Botswana Basketball Records at FIBA Archive

U-18
Men's national under-18 basketball teams